"Screaming Jelly Babies" (British English), also known as "Growling Gummy Bears" (American and Canadian English), is one classroom chemistry demonstration variants of which are practised in schools around the world. It is often used at open evenings to demonstrate the more light-hearted side of secondary school science.

The experiment shows the amount of energy there is in one piece of confectionery; jelly babies, or gummy bears, are often used for theatrics. Potassium chlorate, a strong oxidising agent rapidly oxidises the sugar in the candy causing it to burst into flames producing a "screaming" sound as rapidly expanding gases are emitted from the test tube. The aroma of candy floss (cotton candy) is also given off.

Researchers in Japan developed a new headset in December 2011 that triggers different sounds as wearers close their jaws when eating which included the "heart breaking" squeals of masticated jelly babies. Other carbohydrate or hydrocarbon containing substances can (also) be dropped into test tubes of molten chlorate, with similar results.

References

Further reading

External links
 Jelly Babies - From The University of Nottingham's Periodic Table of Videos

Chemical reactions
Chemistry classroom experiments
Articles containing video clips
Gummi candies